Little Alps is an unincorporated community in Baker County, Oregon, United States. Formerly a ski resort, Little Alps is now a gravel pit.

References

Unincorporated communities in Baker County, Oregon
Unincorporated communities in Oregon